Celebrity Jeopardy! is a series of sketches that aired regularly on the television comedy/variety show Saturday Night Live between 1996 and 2002, the years when Will Ferrell was a cast member. It parodies the same-named special event on the television quiz show Jeopardy! that features competition between notable individuals with all winnings going towards charitable organizations, and significant reductions to the game's level of difficulty. Fifteen sketches aired between December 1996 and February 2015: two sketches per season from 1996 to 2002, and one each in 2005 and 2009, when Ferrell returned to the show as host. The sketch was revived for the Saturday Night Live 40th Anniversary Special on February 15, 2015.

Ferrell portrayed Jeopardy! host Alex Trebek. Darrell Hammond also appeared in each sketch, usually portraying Sean Connery, Trebek's "arch-nemesis" who makes crass insults implying a sexual relationship between Connery and Trebek's mother. Norm Macdonald appeared as Burt Reynolds in six sketches. Jimmy Fallon also appeared six times, portraying a different character in each appearance.

On several occasions, Celebrity Jeopardy! sketches have been referenced during actual episodes of Jeopardy!.

Sketch
The participants in each sketch consist of Ferrell, Hammond, the host for the episode, and a third cast member; after Norm Macdonald left the series, the third celebrity would be most frequently played by Jimmy Fallon. The sketch uses a mockup of the set that had just debuted on the actual Jeopardy! in November 1996, one month before the first Celebrity Jeopardy! sketch debuted on SNL. The actual Jeopardy! would replace the set with a newer version in 2002, months after Ferrell left SNL, even though the same Celebrity Jeopardy! set used during Ferrell's tenure as a regular cast member would be recycled for each of its three subsequent appearances since Ferrell's departure.

The sketch often begins at the start of the Double Jeopardy! round. Trebek welcomes the audience and, occasionally, apologizes for an offense or incident that occurred before the break. He then introduces the celebrity contestants and reveals their scores, which are either $0, a negative score, or a very low positive score. Many times, the contestants refuse or fail to select an appropriate category and dollar value from the game board, grinding the game to a halt and often requiring Trebek to choose one himself. As the celebrities' growing ineptitude and lack of interest became apparent, the subject matter used for categories shifted from normal topics (such as "Movies" and "Popular Music") to more childish topics, categories with titles giving not-so-subtle hints as to the correct response without reading the clues (such as "Famous Kareem Abdul-Jabbars" or "Countries between Mexico and Canada"), and those requiring no responses whatsoever (such as "Automatic Points" or "Tie Your Shoe"). Recurring Jeopardy! category "Potent Potables" appears in every sketch but is never selected, and when it finally is chosen, it results in an inadvertently offensive pre-recorded Video Daily Double involving Bill Cosby.

Instead of buzzing in with the correct questions, contestants either give horribly incorrect responses or say things that have nothing to do with the game, frustrating Trebek, who does nothing to hide his contempt for the celebrities' performance. Trebek's mood is also exacerbated by Connery's pranks and antics, which include making sexual jokes at Trebek's expense, deliberately misreading or vandalizing the categories on the board to turn them into sexually suggestive phrases (such as "Let It Snow" as "Le Tits, Now" or "Catch These Men" as "Catch the Semen"; or in terms of vandalizing, "I Have a Chardonnay" as "I Have a hardon"), and implying that he has had sexual relations with Trebek's mother.

Trebek eventually grows exasperated with his inability to conduct the show and cuts it short by moving to Final Jeopardy!. He either discards the scripted category in favor of a much easier task (such as having the celebrities write and respond to their own questions), or announces a childishly simple category. Even though it appears impossible for the celebrities to fail, they invariably do. Connery occasionally provides a correct response, yet uses his wager to transform the text into a rude phrase or drawing (such as the letter V which is a Roman numeral for 5, until the V was part of the whole wager which reads "SucK it Trebek"). Sometimes Connery appears to have sympathy for Trebek until the wager reveal, which happens to be a rude drawing at Trebek's expense; on an earlier sketch, this is also performed by John Travolta, who in response to a clue asking the celebrities to name their favorite food, responds with "miso", an actual soup, yet when Trebek asks for the wager, reveals it to be "horny", which is read as "me so horny".

Trebek is the beleaguered straight man, and is generally the only person on stage interested in the game. The contestants, who are either unaware of what the game is or uninterested in playing, will ramble incoherently, deliver irrelevant monologues, or openly antagonize the host. Whenever a contestant takes the game seriously, they prove utterly incapable of supplying the correct question. No contestant ever offers a correct response; however, two come close: Phil Donahue and Tony Bennett, who in their respective sketches, offer descriptions for the holiday of Christmas and The Adventures of Tom Sawyer. When Reynolds, who had initially been the celebrity who appeared in each sketch, makes his return appearances, he misreads categories in the same manner as Connery and insists that he be addressed as "Turd Ferguson" because he finds that name funny.

At the end of almost every sketch, all three celebrities have scores in the negative thousands of dollars, and in most cases, a humorous, often sexual, Final Jeopardy! punchline is delivered by Connery. In one of his sketches, Reynolds is declared an unquestioned winner, even though he wins simply because he has the least amount of negative money, rather than actually earning a victory. When Trebek ends the show, he either states that money will not be awarded to charity, that money will be taken away from charity due to the contestants negative scores, or announces his intention to resign or commit suicide.

Episodes

Cast

SNL cast members

A typical Celebrity Jeopardy! sketch featured three cast members (two as contestants and Ferrell as Trebek), plus that week's host as a third contestant. The thirteenth edition of the sketch (Cosby, Sharon Osbourne, Connery) featured three members of the SNL cast as the three contestants and Ferrell, now hosting, reprising his role as Trebek. The episode with Connery, Ozzy Osbourne and Martha Stewart featured cast members in all four roles.

Dean Edwards as Chris Tucker
Jimmy Fallon as Adam Sandler, Nicolas Cage, French Stewart, Hilary Swank, Robin Williams and Dave Matthews
Will Ferrell as Alex Trebek
Ana Gasteyer as Martha Stewart
Darrell Hammond as Sean Connery, Phil Donahue and John Travolta
Taran Killam as Christoph Waltz
Norm Macdonald as Burt Reynolds
Kate McKinnon as Justin Bieber
Amy Poehler as Sharon Osbourne
Horatio Sanz as Ozzy Osbourne
Molly Shannon as Minnie Driver
Kenan Thompson as Bill Cosby
Kristen Wiig as Kathie Lee Gifford

SNL hosts
Thirteen of the fifteen sketches included the episode's host, usually as a contestant. The tenth sketch was one of two not to feature a host, as it was part of an SNL primetime special that did not feature a guest host. The 40th anniversary special also did not have a host. Both Ferrell and Macdonald were previous cast members who reprised their Celebrity Jeopardy! role upon their return. Notably, two hosts appeared as actual contestants on the real Celebrity Jeopardy!: David Duchovny (in 1995 and 2010) and Martin Short (in 2006).

Alec Baldwin as Tony Bennett
Drew Barrymore as Calista Flockhart
Jim Carrey as Matthew McConaughey
David Duchovny as Jeff Goldblum
Will Ferrell as Alex Trebek
John Goodman as Marlon Brando
Tom Hanks as himself
Lucy Liu as Catherine Zeta-Jones
Norm Macdonald as Burt Reynolds (who changed his name to Turd Ferguson in several sketches, claiming "it's a funny name"). 
Tobey Maguire as Keanu Reeves
Matthew Perry as Michael Keaton
Winona Ryder as Björk
Martin Short as Jerry Lewis
Ben Stiller as Tom Cruise
Reese Witherspoon as Anne Heche

Background
Norm Macdonald was inspired to create the first Celebrity Jeopardy! after noting how much easier the questions on the real-life Celebrity Jeopardy! were compared to regular episodes. A fan of the sketch series SCTV, Macdonald acknowledged that his concept would be substantially the same as "Half-Wits," a recurring sketch on SCTV in which Eugene Levy played a parody of Trebek, exasperated by the incredibly dumb contestants on the program. Macdonald called Levy and secured permission to co-opt the premise of the sketch.

During the May 2007 special Saturday Night Live in the '90s: Pop Culture Nation, Macdonald said he created the Celebrity Jeopardy! sketch purely as an excuse to do his Burt Reynolds impersonation. He purposely chose to make Reynolds an anachronism, appearing on stage as if Reynolds was still the same age he was in 1972. Macdonald also claims that Reynolds was a fan of the sketch and that there were talks to do a sketch where the real Reynolds would crash the game and punch out Macdonald. Reynolds would then play the remainder of the game, with his responses being even dumber than Macdonald's. However, Macdonald was fired from SNL before that sketch could be written.

The host and contestants are played as caricatures of their real life personalities. Hammond said that, while his initial Connery impression was as accurate as possible, it would eventually morph into a "bastardization" of the actor, which audiences—and Hammond himself—found far more entertaining. Though Trebek shaved his trademark mustache in 2001, Ferrell retained it as long as he played the character, even in the twelfth sketch—Ferrell's last episode as a cast member—when a clean-shaven real Trebek made a cameo at the end.

Critical reactions
Critical responses to the sketches have been positive. In 2008, Ferrell's portrayal of Trebek was #3 in IGNs "Top 15 Will Ferrell characters".

Impact
Jeopardy! host Alex Trebek mentioned his admiration for Will Ferrell's impression of him in interviews. Trebek also stated that during every taping of the show, he was asked by one of the audience members how he felt about Ferrell's impression, and always replied that he loved it. On several occasions, Celebrity Jeopardy! sketches have been referenced during actual Jeopardy! episodes:

In the May 19, 1999 Celebrity Jeopardy! episode, the Jeopardy! round featured the category "'S' Words", and the Double Jeopardy! round featured "Swords" in the same column (in the first sketch, wherein "'S' Words" is a category, Connery misreads it as "Swords"). During the September 5, 2001, episode, the Double Jeopardy! categories were "Sean Connery", "Surprise Me, Trebek!", "Therapists" (misread by Connery as "The Rapists"), "Things You Shouldn't Put in Your Mouth", "The Number After 2", and "Rhymes With 'Dog'".

The June 27, 2006, show featured the category "Japan-U.S. Relations", which had been misread by Connery as "Jap Anus Relations". In the November 8 and 16, 2006 Celebrity Jeopardy! episodes, categories included "Surprise Me, Trebek!" and "Answers That Start With 'Feb'", respectively (the latter of which is a reference to the category "" from the sketch). On the September 24, 2008 episode, the Jeopardy! round featured the category "Stars With Feb, Trebek".  When contestant Brian Levinson first selected the category, he did so in a Sean Connery voice.   On the November 23, 2009, show, the categories in the Jeopardy! round were "SNL Celebrity Jeopardy!", "States That End in Hampshire", "What Color Is Green?", "Current Black presidents", "Sounds That Kitties Make", and "Twinkle Twinkle Little Word That Rhymes With Star".

A May 15, 2015 Celebrity Jeopardy! featured "The Pen is Mightier", a category about famous authors and their books (which was misread in a Celebrity Jeopardy! sketch as "The Penis Mightier" by Connery, who thought it was a penis enlargement product); and on September 16, 2015, a contestant who did not know the actual answer jokingly guessed "The Love Ballad of Turd Ferguson" during Final Jeopardy!

The Jeopardy! round from the July 8, 2016, episode featured the categories "States That Begin with Californ", "Is That a Hat?", "Catch These Men" (which Connery reads in a sketch as "Catch The Semen"), "A Petite Dejeuner" (a respelling of the category from the sketch which was "A Petit Dejeuner", which Connery misread as "Ape Tit Dejeuner"), "'S' Words" (which appeared again after appearing in 1999), and "SNL Cracks Us Up".  On July 10, 2019, the Jeopardy! round featured the category "An Album Cover", which Connery reads in a sketch as "Anal Bum Cover".

The category "Surprise Me, Trebek!" appeared again in the Jeopardy! The Greatest of All Time special in 2020.  When contestant Brad Rutter picked the category for the first time, he too shouted its name in an imitation Sean Connery voice.

The February 6, 2023 episode featured the category "Months That Start with Feb".

Home video releases
The October 1999 Celebrity Jeopardy! sketch featuring Sean Connery, Burt Reynolds, and French Stewart was featured in the SNL Game Show Parodies compilation special from February 2000 and its later home video release. The special was co-hosted by Will Ferrell in character as Alex Trebek alongside Darrell Hammond as then-Who Wants to Be a Millionaire host Regis Philbin, who was briefly mentioned in the April 2000 Celebrity Jeopardy! installment. Two of the three Best of Will Ferrell home video compilations would include Celebrity Jeopardy! sketches, including the Connery/Reynolds/Stewart sketch in 2003's first volume and 2005's Connery/Osbourne/Cosby installment in 2010's third volume.

Other Jeopardy! sketches
Saturday Night Live has parodied Jeopardy! in other unrelated sketches, such as the futuristic parody Jeopardy! 1999 from October 1976, the comedy themed Stand Up and Win in 1992, "Das Ist Jeöpardy!" (an episode of Sprockets) in November 1993, and the April 1995 sketch Gapardy, featuring The Gap Girls.

Additionally, various contestant impersonations, including Connery and Reynolds, have appeared outside of Celebrity Jeopardy! sketches with the same cast members.

Black Jeopardy!
A recurring sketch in more recent seasons is Black Jeopardy!, which debuted in season 39, and whose clues frequently invoke African American stereotypes.

Black Jeopardy! is hosted by Darnell Hayes (Kenan Thompson), and whose contestants often include two stereotypical African American contestants and the third either being a white person, a foreigner of African descent, or someone who is ignoring the game for their own personal agenda. The first two contestants are always played by the regular cast members and always have an African American name, while the third contestant is always played by the guest host and almost always with a more "European" name that catches Darnell by surprise. Among the "third" contestants have been:

Mark, a professor of African American studies at Brigham Young University. (Louis C.K.)
Allison, who "understands Black culture because she once dated a Black man" and claims to be "color blind". (Elizabeth Banks)
Doug, a Donald Trump-supporter with a MAGA hat. (Tom Hanks) Doug surprisingly does well until the Final Black Jeopardy! category is revealed as "Lives That Matter"
T'Challa, Prince of Wakanda. (Chadwick Boseman)
Jared, a Black Canadian. (Drake)
Velvet Jones, an African American contestant who promotes his consultation business on how women can make money as prostitutes through numerous books. (Eddie Murphy)

The sketches are implied to take place in an apartment building in a residential neighborhood as opposed to a TV studio, and also have several sponsors pertaining to African American stereotypes, most of them fictional though Sprite was listed as one due to that drink's long association with the National Basketball Association.

See also
 Recurring Saturday Night Live characters and sketches

References

External links

Saturday Night Live sketches
Saturday Night Live in the 1990s
Saturday Night Live in the 2000s
Jeopardy!
Parodies of television shows
Mass media franchises introduced in 1996